The Economic was a British three-wheeled cyclecar made from 1919 to 1922 by Economic Motors of Wells Street, London, W1. It was, at £60, almost certainly the cheapest car on the British market at the time.

The car had a single front wheel and no suspension, relying on the tyres and the flexibility of its ash frame to absorb road bumps. The two seater body was very simple with no windscreen or weather protection. The bodywork was minimal.

The 165 cc, air-cooled, flat twin two-stroke engine drove the right-hand rear wheel by chain, and a variable-speed friction drive transmission was used, giving two forwards speeds and reverse. A top speed of 30 mph was claimed.

A motorcycle using the same engine, also with friction drive, was also offered for £28 10 shillings.

See also
 List of car manufacturers of the United Kingdom

References 

Defunct motor vehicle manufacturers of England
Cyclecars
Motor vehicle manufacturers based in London
Vehicle manufacturing companies established in 1919
Cars introduced in 1919